Alan Smolinisky is an American entrepreneur/investor and part-owner of the Los Angeles Dodgers Major League Baseball franchise. In June 2022, Smolinisky partnered with Nike founder Phil Knight and submitted an offer of more than $2 billion to purchase the Portland Trail Blazers National Basketball Association franchise.

Smolinisky began his career in commercial real estate in the late 1990s while attending the University of Southern California.  Smolinisky partnered with his then landlord Brian Chen.  Together, through their company Conquest Student Housing, they built and renovated properties around Campus, eventually becoming the largest provider of student housing at USC, and later at the University of California at Santa Barbara.  Conquest became so dominant at USC that the University sued the company under the Sherman Antitrust Act for "monopolizing the student housing market around USC's University Park Campus".

The company was sold to a private equity firm and publicly traded REIT in summer 2008 for $205 million. After the sale, Smolinisky and Chen focused on public securities investment.

Smolinisky and Chen are value investors, an investment paradigm that derives from the ideas on investment that Benjamin Graham and David Dodd began teaching at Columbia Business School in 1928, focusing on acquiring assets below their intrinsic value. Today, that movement is most closely associated with Berkshire Hathaway Chairman Warren E. Buffett and Vice Chairman Charlie T. Munger.

Smolinisky and Chen manage their own personal capital from Pacific Palisades, California with investments in commercial real estate, publicly traded securities, energy, capital equipment leasing and venture capital.

The Los Angeles Dodgers 
Smolinisky became an owner of the Los Angeles Dodgers and the team's home, Dodger Stadium, in 2019, joining partners Mark Walter, Earvin "Magic" Johnson, Peter Guber, Stan Kasten, Bobby Patton, Todd Boehly and Billie Jean King.  In the team's press release announcing his purchase, Smolinisky said "I'm a lifelong Dodger fan and to now be a part of their ownership group is an exciting opportunity and time for me and my family."

In a Time magazine piece written by Smolinisky, he described his purchase as a way to honor his immigrant father's love of America and baseball.

In it's 2023 rankings, Sportico estimated the value of the Dodgers at $5.24 billion.

The Palisadian-Post 
In 2012, Smolinisky purchased the Palisadian-Post, a weekly subscription based newspaper that serves Pacific Palisades, California.  The Palisadian-Post was founded in 1928 and has been published every Thursday since its founding.  A 2013 front-page Los Angeles Times profile of Smolinisky quoted him as saying "Pacific Palisades is my favorite place on Earth, and the Palisadian-Post is my favorite newspaper.  I have a moral obligation to make sure this newspaper is published every Thursday for as long as I live."  Shortly after his purchase, Smolinisky shut down the printing business, replaced most of the staff, and sold the paper's longtime building due to the printing operation being outsourced.  Some community members were upset with the abrupt changes. The paper currently has 17 staff members at headquarters in the Palisadian-Post building in the Palisades Village and 5,000 paid subscribers.  A one-year subscription costs $79.

Personal life 
Smolinisky was raised in Pacific Palisades by immigrant parents from Argentina. In a 2019 Harvard University talk, Smolinisky described a difficult childhood including being expelled from two schools before the age of 13. From an early age, Smolinisky was a voracious reader of newspapers, financial reports and books about business, and reportedly spends five hours per day reading. He graduated in three years from the University of Southern California's Thornton School of Music in 2001.

In 2010, Smolinisky married Caroline Sukits from Indiana.  They have three children.  Their son Charlie was named after Charlie Munger.  According to public records, Smolinisky bought two adjacent parcels of land in Pacific Palisades totaling 2.15 acres for $10.8 million in September 2010 from professional baseball player Jason Kendall, and built a new 18,000 square foot estate that includes a car gallery. Federal Aviation Administration records show Smolinisky as the registered owner of a 14-passenger Gulfstream aircraft. In August 2015 at Monterey Car Week, an electric GEM car outfitted as a 1970s Land Rover Defender designed by Smolinisky and Sir Lucian Grainge won the award for Rueful Brittania (Best British Car) at the annual Concours d'LeMons.

Views and philanthropy 
Smolinisky is an advocate for bi-partisan common sense immigration reform pressing for a country that is both welcoming and secure.  On August 29, 2022, Smolinisky organized the first ever Naturalization Ceremony held at Dodger Stadium.  It was the largest ceremony since the start of Covid.  2,119 new citizens from 120 countries were sworn in on the field.  In his speech, Smolinisky described his parent’s journey as poor immigrants who sacrificed everything to give their children a better life.  The speech was later published as an op-ed in USA Today.

Smolinisky often speaks of his dislike of dynastic wealth. Inspired by Warren Buffett and Bill Gates' Giving Pledge, he and his wife created a trust that provides for 90% of their estate to go to charity upon their death. Smolinisky serves on the board of directors of Homeboy Industries, a gang intervention organization founded by Jesuit priest Fr. Gregory Boyle and serves on the board of directors for the LA Dodgers Foundation, the official team charity of the LA Dodgers.  Smolinisky served on the board of the ACLU of Southern California  from 2004-2016.

References

External links
LA Downtown News 2004 profile
Los Angeles Times 2013 profile
Why I've Bought the Palisadian-Post
The Wall Street Journal 2019 Dodgers announcement
Time magazine 2019 op-ed
The Wall Street Journal 2020 op-ed
USA Today 2022 op-ed

1979 births
Living people
21st-century American newspaper publishers (people)
Businesspeople from Los Angeles
USC Thornton School of Music alumni
People from Pacific Palisades, California
Los Angeles Dodgers executives
Los Angeles Dodgers owners
Major League Baseball executives